Aliaksandr Bury and Andreas Siljeström were the defending champions but chose not to defend their title.

Dino Marcan and Tristan-Samuel Weissborn won the title after defeating Blaž Kavčič and Franko Škugor 6–3, 3–6, [16–14] in the final.

Seeds

Draw

References
 Main Draw

Hungarian Challenger Open - Doubles